"Where Was I" is a song written by Gary Burr and Harry Stinson, and recorded by American country music artist Ricky Van Shelton.  It was released in January 1994 as the second single from the album A Bridge I Didn't Burn.  The song reached number 20 on the Billboard Hot Country Singles & Tracks chart, and was the last top 40 country hit of his career.

Chart performance
"Where Was I" debuted at number 70 on the U.S. Billboard Hot Country Singles & Tracks for the week of January 15, 1994.

References

1994 singles
Ricky Van Shelton songs
Songs written by Gary Burr
Song recordings produced by Steve Buckingham (record producer)
Columbia Records singles
Music videos directed by Deaton-Flanigen Productions
1993 songs
Songs written by Harry Stinson (musician)